Nadiya Oleksiyivna Svitlychna (born 8 November 1936, the village of Polovynkyne, Starobilsk district, Luhansk region — 8 August 2006, Irvington, New Jersey, United States) was a Ukrainian dissident and human rights activist, and an active member of the Ukrainian Helsinki group. She was a writer and editor and for a time was a political prisoner of the Soviet regime.

Svitlychna was praised by Ukraine's President Viktor Yushchenko, who stated that "her views, the way she lived her life and passed along values to the next generation, have left footsteps to follow for millions of contemporary Ukrainian patriots."

After emigrating to the United States in November 1978 she became a member, along with General Petro Grigorenko and Leonid Plyushch (and later others) of the External Representation of the Ukrainian Helsinki Group and continued her work in advocating human and national rights in Ukraine and protesting Soviet violations of the Helsinki Accords.

Notes and references

External links 
 Obituary, khpg.org
 

1936 births
2006 deaths
People from Luhansk Oblast
National University of Kharkiv alumni
Ukrainian dissidents
Ukrainian human rights activists
Soviet human rights activists
Women human rights activists
Ukrainian Helsinki Group
Recipients of the Shevchenko National Prize
Recipients of the Vasyl Stus Prize
Soviet dissidents
Ukrainian anti-Soviet resistance movement